Molodyozhny (masculine), Molodyozhnaya (feminine), or Molodyozhnoye (neuter) is the name of several inhabited localities in Russia.

Modern localities

Altai Krai
As of 2012, two rural localities in Altai Krai bear this name:
Molodyozhny, Pavlovsky District, Altai Krai, a settlement in Kolyvansky Selsoviet of Pavlovsky District; 
Molodyozhny, Rebrikhinsky District, Altai Krai, a settlement in Panovsky Selsoviet of Rebrikhinsky District;

Chuvash Republic
As of 2012, one rural locality in the Chuvash Republic bears this name:
Molodyozhny, Chuvash Republic, a settlement in Mikhaylovskoye Rural Settlement of Tsivilsky District

Irkutsk Oblast
As of 2012, two rural localities in Irkutsk Oblast bear this name:
Molodyozhny, Irkutsky District, Irkutsk Oblast, a settlement in Irkutsky District
Molodyozhny, Zhigalovsky District, Irkutsk Oblast, a settlement in Zhigalovsky District

Republic of Kalmykia
As of 2012, two rural localities in the Republic of Kalmykia bear this name:
Molodyozhny, Priyutnensky District, Republic of Kalmykia, a settlement in Oktyabrskaya Rural Administration of Priyutnensky District; 
Molodyozhny, Yashkulsky District, Republic of Kalmykia, a settlement in Molodezhnenskaya Rural Administration of Yashkulsky District;

Kaluga Oblast
As of 2012, one rural locality in Kaluga Oblast bears this name:
Molodyozhny, Kaluga Oblast, a settlement in Meshchovsky District

Khabarovsk Krai
As of 2012, one rural locality in Khabarovsk Krai bears this name:
Molodyozhny, Khabarovsk Krai, a settlement in Komsomolsky District

Kostroma Oblast
As of 2012, three rural localities in Kostroma Oblast bear this name:
Molodyozhny, Krasnoselsky District, Kostroma Oblast, a settlement in Borovikovskoye Settlement of Krasnoselsky District
Molodyozhny, Nerekhtsky District, Kostroma Oblast, a settlement in Prigorodnoye Settlement of Nerekhtsky District
Molodyozhny, Parfenyevsky District, Kostroma Oblast, a settlement in Parfenyevskoye Settlement of Parfenyevsky District

Krasnodar Krai
As of 2012, one rural locality in Krasnodar Krai bears this name:
Molodyozhny, Krasnodar Krai, a settlement in Chernigovsky Rural Okrug of Belorechensky District

Moscow Oblast
As of 2012, two inhabited localities in Moscow Oblast bear this name:
Molodyozhny, Moscow Oblast, an urban locality (a settlement) under the administrative jurisdiction of the closed administrative-territorial formation of the same name
Molodyozhny, Podolsky District, Moscow Oblast, a rural locality (a settlement) in Lagovskoye Rural Settlement of Podolsky District

Nizhny Novgorod Oblast
As of 2012, one rural locality in Nizhny Novgorod Oblast bears this name:
Molodyozhny, Nizhny Novgorod Oblast, a settlement in Ababkovsky Selsoviet of Pavlovsky District

Omsk Oblast
As of 2012, one rural locality in Omsk Oblast bears this name:
Molodyozhnoye, Omsk Oblast, a village in Pobedovsky Rural Okrug of Novovarshavsky District

Orenburg Oblast
As of 2012, one rural locality in Orenburg Oblast bears this name:
Molodyozhny, Orenburg Oblast, a settlement in Molodyozhny Selsoviet of Totsky District

Primorsky Krai
As of 2012, one rural locality in Primorsky Krai bears this name:
Molodyozhnoye, Primorsky Krai, a selo in Krasnoarmeysky District

Rostov Oblast
As of 2012, two rural localities in Rostov Oblast bear this name:
Molodyozhny, Kamensky District, Rostov Oblast, a settlement in Astakhovskoye Rural Settlement of Kamensky District
Molodyozhny, Krasnosulinsky District, Rostov Oblast, a settlement in Mikhaylovskoye Rural Settlement of Krasnosulinsky District

Ryazan Oblast
As of 2012, two rural localities in Ryazan Oblast bear this name:
Molodyozhny, Miloslavsky District, Ryazan Oblast, a settlement in Olshansky Rural Okrug of Miloslavsky District
Molodyozhny, Sasovsky District, Ryazan Oblast, a settlement in Temgenevsky Rural Okrug of Sasovsky District

Saint Petersburg
As of 2012, one urban locality in Saint Petersburg bears this name:
Molodyozhnoye, Saint Petersburg, a municipal settlement in Kurortny District

Sakhalin Oblast
As of 2012, one rural locality in Sakhalin Oblast bears this name:
Molodyozhnoye, Sakhalin Oblast, a selo in Tymovsky District

Saratov Oblast
As of 2012, one rural locality in Saratov Oblast bears this name:
Molodyozhny, Saratov Oblast, a settlement in Perelyubsky District

Sverdlovsk Oblast
As of 2012, two rural localities in Sverdlovsk Oblast bear this name:
Molodyozhny, Beryozovsky, Sverdlovsk Oblast, a settlement under the administrative jurisdiction of the City of Beryozovsky
Molodyozhny, Prigorodny District, Sverdlovsk Oblast, a settlement in Prigorodny District

Tambov Oblast
As of 2012, one rural locality in Tambov Oblast bears this name:
Molodyozhny, Tambov Oblast, a settlement in Algasovsky Selsoviet of Morshansky District

Republic of Tatarstan
As of 2012, one rural locality in the Republic of Tatarstan bears this name:
Molodyozhny, Republic of Tatarstan, a settlement in Almetyevsky District

Tomsk Oblast
As of 2012, two rural localities in Tomsk Oblast bear this name:
Molodyozhny, Kargasoksky District, Tomsk Oblast, a settlement in Kargasoksky District
Molodyozhny, Tomsky District, Tomsk Oblast, a settlement in Tomsky District

Tula Oblast
As of 2012, one rural locality in Tula Oblast bears this name:
Molodyozhny, Tula Oblast, a settlement in Medvensky Rural Okrug of Leninsky District

Volgograd Oblast
As of 2012, one rural locality in Volgograd Oblast bears this name:
Molodyozhny, Volgograd Oblast, a settlement in Zelenovsky Selsoviet of Bykovsky District

Vologda Oblast
As of 2012, two rural localities in Vologda Oblast bear this name:
Molodyozhny, Nikolsky District, Vologda Oblast, a settlement in Polezhayevsky Selsoviet of Nikolsky District
Molodyozhny, Vozhegodsky District, Vologda Oblast, a settlement in Maryinsky Selsoviet of Vozhegodsky District

Voronezh Oblast
As of 2012, one rural locality in Voronezh Oblast bears this name:
Molodyozhny, Voronezh Oblast, a settlement in Novopostoyalovskoye Rural Settlement of Rossoshansky District

Zabaykalsky Krai
As of 2012, one rural locality in Zabaykalsky Krai bears this name:
Molodyozhny, Zabaykalsky Krai, a settlement in Priargunsky District

Abolished localities
Molodyozhny, Udmurt Republic, a pochinok in Yakshursky Selsoviet of Zavyalovsky District; abolished in June 2013